West Kilimanjaro Airstrip  is an airstrip in the Kilimanjaro Region of Tanzania. It is near Kilimanjaro National Park.

Airlines and destinations

See also

List of airports in Tanzania
Transport in Tanzania

References

External links
Tanzania Airports Authority
OpenStreetMap - West Kilimanjaro
OurAirports - West Kilimanjaro

Airstrips in Tanzania
Buildings and structures in the Kilimanjaro Region